Turetsky Choir (art group) is a Russian men's a cappella ensemble and musical collective under the direction of Mikhail Turetsky. Their voices range from tenore contraltino to basso profundo.

Background 
The Turetsky Men's Choir was established at the Moscow Choral Synagogue. The chorus made its debut in 1990 with Jewish liturgical and folk music in the philharmonic halls of Tallinn and Kaliningrad. It has been a vehicle throughout Russia for renewed interest in the Jewish heritage. 

In his blog "Teruah Jewish Music" Jack Zaientz wrote, "I don't know if any of the choir members, including Turetsky, are Jewish or what being Jewish might mean to them...  And I'm not sure how much it matters. Seeing a bunch of seriously good male vocalists singing Jewish music to a huge crowd of Russians, in the face of the centuries of discrimination that Russian Jews have faced, does my heart proud."

History 
 1989 — Chorus formed by Mikhail Turetsky at the Moscow Choral Synagogue.
 1990 — With financial support from the American Jewish Joint Distribution Committee, the choir made its official debut at the Moscow Choral Synagogue. The Choir gave its first concerts in Kaliningrad, Tallinn, Chisinau, Kiev, Leningrad, Moscow and other cities.
 1991–1992 — Performances in the United States. The Choir sang in Washington, D.C. for Congress at the Chanukah celebration, the Park East Synagogue in New York, and at Carnegie and Merkin Halls. They were invited to sing in Spain at the "Por Me Espiritu" international festival, commemorating the 500th year since the Spanish expulsion of the Jews.
 1993–1994 — Tours in England, Israel, United States, Poland. In 1993, the American Cantor Association awarded Mikhail Turetsky the Golden Crown of the Cantors of the World Award.
 1995–1996 — The Choir split into two parts. One part stayed in Moscow; the other went to Miami, Florida to work at Temple Emmanu-El Synagogue. The Choir performed together with Julio Iglesias. The repertoire of the Choir grew to include folk songs, opera arias, Broadway classics, jazz pieces. When the group returned to Moscow, were named the city's official Jewish choir by Mayor Yuri Lujkov.
 1997 — The group took part in over 100 concerts in Iosif Kobzon's Russian farewell tour and was recognized as a State Choir.
 1998–1999 — The Choir toured the Commonwealth of Independent States (CIS), Spain, the Netherlands, Germany, Belgium, Switzerland, Australia, and the United States. During the choir's stay in the US, February 6 was proclaimed the Moscow Jewish Choir Day.
 2000–2001 — Joint tour with Iosif Kobzon. Performances in Israel, the USA, Australia, Germany, and the CIS. The choir performed on the stage of the Moscow State Variety Theatre.
 2002 — Mikhail Turetsky received the title "Honored Artist of the Russian Federation" for his achievements in the arts.
 2002–2003 — Touring the United States and Europe.
 January 2004 — The first performance under the name Turetsky Choir Art Group. The program, "The Ten Voices that Overwhelmed the World," brought Mikhail an award in the category "Cultural Event of the Year" of the national "Man of the Year Award."
 December 2004 — The choir presented the program "When Men Are Singing" in the State Kremlin Palace with the participation of Emma Shapplin and Gloria Gaynor.
 January 2005 — Performances in concert halls of the United States in San Francisco, Los Angeles, Atlantic City, Boston, Chicago.
 2005–2006 — The anniversary tour "Born to Sing" visited more than 100 cities in Russia and the CIS.
 2006–2007 — The choir toured 70 cities in Russia and the CIS with the program "Music of All Times and Peoples."
 2007 — The choir received the Russian Music Award "Record 2007" for the best classical album of the year (the collector's edition of Great Music). It was also recognized for the children's charity concert "Be Kind-Hearted Today!". The concert for a group of children in the State Kremlin Palace occurred March 27 with support of the Moscow’s Government and the Committee of Culture of the Moscow. More than 5,000 children (gifted and talented children, children from a socially disadvantaged background and those from families having many children, children with disabilities) attended. The choir received a National "Emotion" Award in the category "Respect".
 2007–2008 — "Hallelujah to Love" Tour around Russia and the CIS. The choir performed four times at the Kremlin and had another concert at State Concert Hall "Rossiya" (ru: ГЦКЗ "Россия"), in Luzhniki.
 2008–2009 — Touring Russia, the CIS, and the USA with the new program "And the Show Goes On..."
 2010–2011 — anniversary tour "20 years: 10 voices"
 2011 — tour "The beginning" starts.

Soloists

Discography

References

External links
 Official website
 Passport Magazine about Mikhail Turetsky
 RJC-SPONSORED PROJECTS: MOSCOW JEWISH CHAMBER CHOIR
 Article about the choir in "Ogonyok" magazine ru: ТУРЕЦКИЙ НА МАРШЕ
 

Russian choirs
Hazzans
Jewish musical groups
Musical groups established in 1989
1989 establishments in the Soviet Union